This page lists the World Best Year Performance in the year 2004 in the men's decathlon. The main event during this season were the 2004 Olympic Games in Athens, Greece, where the competition started on August 23, 2004 and ended on August 24, 2004 in the Athens Olympic Stadium.

Records

2004 World Year Ranking

See also
2004 Décastar
2004 Hypo-Meeting

References
decathlon2000
IAAF
apulanta

2004
Decathlon Year Ranking, 2004